Roodebeek is a Brussels Metro station on line 1. It is located in the municipality of Woluwe-Saint-Lambert/Sint-Lambrechts-Woluwe, in the eastern part of Brussels, Belgium, and opened on 7 May 1982.

The station serves the Woluwe Shopping Centre and a bus interchange. It takes its name from the nearby Roodebeek Park.

The Brussels Metro lines were renumbered on 4 April 2009. Prior to this, the station was on the eastern branch of line 1B. On 29 September 2018, an interchange with tram line 8 was added at the station.

References

External links

Brussels metro stations
Railway stations opened in 1982
Woluwe-Saint-Lambert
1982 establishments in Belgium